This is a list of Swedish noble families, which are divided into two main groups:
Introduced nobility, i.e. noble families introduced at the Swedish House of Nobility
Unintroduced nobility, i.e. noble families which have not been introduced at the Swedish House of Nobility, mostly consisting of foreign nobility resident in Sweden, but also including some families ennobled by the Swedish monarchs and some other groups.

The introduced nobility is divided into three ranks: Comital families, Baronial families and untitled noble families (in addition, members of the royal family hold ducal titles).

The unintroduced nobility consists of families of princely, ducal, marquis, comital, baronial, and untitled noble rank. This group notably includes several branches of the House of Bernadotte with foreign (princely and comital) noble titles (such as Count of Wisborg).

The vast majority of both introduced and unintroduced noble families are untitled.

Introduced nobility

The introduced noble families are listed in the Palace of the Nobility according to the official numbering system which roughly corresponds to the order of introduction. Lower numbers indicate older nobility. Higher numbers indicate later introduction, and usually means that the family belongs to the younger nobility, even though introduction may occasionally not have followed immediately upon ennoblement. In the case of families of Countly or Baronial status, higher numbers indicate that it was raised to a higher title at a later point in time. Branches of the same family may have been introduced under different numbers and may appear in more than one place in the list.

Families with the title of count (Grevliga ätter)

 Brahe
 Lewenhaupt (of the same origin as Leijonhufvud)
 De la Gardie
 Oxenstierna af Södermöre
 von Thurn
 af Wasaborg
 Torstensson
 Oxenstierna af Korsholm och Wasa
 Horn af Björneborg
 Oxenstierna af Croneborg
 Banér
 Stenbock
 Wrangel af Salmis
 von Köningsmarck
 Wittenberg
 Tott
 Lillie
 
 Douglas
 Schlippenbach
 von Steinberg
 Carlsson
 von Ascheberg
 Gyllenstierna af Ericsberg
 Wachtmeister af Johannishus
 Fleming
 Wrede
 Sperling
 Bielke
 Lichton
 Hastfer
 Lindschöld
 Stålarm
 Gyllenstierna af Steninge
 
 Dahlberg
 Wrangel af Adinal
 Falkenberg af Sandemar
 Wachtmeister af Mälsåker
 Wallenstedt
 Bonde af Björnö
 Gyllenborg
 Mellin
 Polus
 Gyllenstierna af Björksund och Helgö
 Piper
 Gyllenstierna af Fogelvik
 Rehnskiöld
 Frölich
 Stromberg
 Posse
 Nieroth
 Horn af Ekebyholm
 Spens
 Cronhielm af Flosta
 von Fersen
 Reenstierna
 Tessin
 Meijerfeldt
 Mörner af Morlanda
 Dücker
 Taube
 Sparre af Sundby
 Bonde af Säfstaholm
 Dohna
 Sparre af Söfdeborg
 von Liewen
 Creutz
 Cronhielm af Hakunge
 Horn af Rantzien
 Ekeblad
 Lillienstedt
 Leijonstedt
 Sparre
 Lagerberg
 Strömfelt
 Törnflycht
 Hård
 Putbus
 von Düben
 Barck
 von Hessenstein
 Cronstedt
 Löwen
 von Rosen
 Hamilton
 Löwenhielm
 von Seth
 von Höpken
 von Hermansson
 Kalling
 Horn af Åminne
 Wrangel af Sauss
 von Schwerin
 Sinclair
 von Saltza
 Falkenberg af Bålby
 Stålhandske
 Wrangel
 Stackelberg
 Lillienberg
 Bunge
 Munck
 Beck-Friis
 af Ugglas
 Strömfelt
 Klingspor
 Ruuth
 Mörner af Tuna
 von Lantinghausen
 Sparre
 Taube
 Ehrensvärd
 Thott
 Lagerbjelke
 Anckarsvärd
 von Stedingk
 von Essen
 Ridderstolpe
 Liljecrantz
 von Engeström
 Puke
 Rosenblad
 Sandels
 Adlercreutz
 von Platen
 Toll (Swedish family)
 Barnekow
 Tawast
 Adlersparre
 de Geer af Leufsta
 Fleming
 Snoilsky
 Lagerbring
 Cederström
 af Wetterstedt
 Skjöldebrand
 Adelswärd
 Wirsén
 Björnstjerna
 Posse
 von Saltza

Baronial families (Friherrliga ätter)

 Oxenstierna af Eka och Lindö
 Horn af Åminne
 Gyllenstierna af Lundholm
 De la Gardie
 Schenck
 Bielke
 Gyllenhielm
 Skytte af Duderhof
 Spens
 Khewenhüller
 Sparre,
 Bååt
 Lilliehöök
 Cruus af Gudhem
 Ryning
 Kurck
 Fleming af Liebelitz
 Gyllenstierna af Ulaborg
 Soop af Limingo
 Bonde
 Horn af Marienborg
 Banér
 Natt och Dag
 Stiernsköld
 Posse af Hedensund
 Leijonhufvud
 
 Bielkenstierna
 Rosenhane
 von Yxkull-Gyllenband
 Wachtmeister af Björkö
 von Bellingshausen
 Paykull
 Taube af Karlö
 Forbus
 Mörner af Tuna
 Ulfsparre af Broxvik
 von der Linde
 Fleming af Lais
 Ribbing af Zernava
 Wrangel af Lindeberg
 Kruse af Kajbala
 Sperling
 Wrede af Elimä
 von Liewen
 Berendes
 Stake
 Creutz
 Fleetwood
 Hamilton af Deserf
 Cronstierna
 von Scheiding
 Leijonsköld
 von Ungern-Sternberg
 Wrangel af Ludenhof
 Gripenhielm
 Posse af Säby, unintroduced comital
 Schultz von Ascheraden
 Rålamb
 Grundel-Helmfelt
 von der Noth
 Mörner af Morlanda
 von Fersen
 Duwall
 de Mortaigne
 Taube af Kudding
 Palbitzki
 von Buchwaldt
 Uggla
 Marschalck
 von Börstell
 Vellingk
 Marderfelt
 Meijendorff von Yxkull
 von der Pahlen
 Kruuse af Verchou
 Rehbinder
 Taube af Sesswegen
 Siöblad
 Grothusen
 von Schönleben
 Clerck
 Örneklou
 Gyldenhoff
 Tungel
 Thegner
 Soop
 Lovisin
 Leijonberg
 Nieroth
 Grass
 Mellin
 Lindhielm
 Cronhielm
 Eldstierna
 Ankarstierna
 Fägerskiöld
 von Budberg
 Hamilton af Hageby
 Müller von der Lühnen
 Gyllenpistol
 Maydell
 Bergenhjelm
 von der Osten genannt Sacken
 Strömfelt
 Hoghusen
 Cronhjort
 Lillieroth
 Pincier
 Taube af Odenkat
 Stuart
 Trotzig
 Lagercrona
 Hummerhielm
 von Palmenberg
 Burensköld
 Coyet
 Stromberg
 Lybecker
 Faltzburg
 Hård
 Zülich
 Palmqvist
 Hogguer
 Strömfelt
 Clodt
 Stackelberg
 Fahlström
 Feif
 Ranck
 Patkull von Posendorff
 Cronberg
 von Schwerin
 Cederhielm,
 von Düben
 Cronstedt
 Bildstein
 Giertta
 von Düben
 Leuhusen
 Wachschlager
 Leijonhielm
 Cedercreutz
 Scheffer
 Stiernstedt
 von Psilander
 Fock
 Appelman
 Törnflycht
 von Otter
 Cronstedt
 von Hylteen
 Törnflycht
 Bennet
 Staël von Holstein
 Lagerberg
 von Krassow
 von Essen
 Silfverhielm
 Koskull
 von Höpken
 Barck
 Horn af Rantzien
 Appelbom
 Örnfelt
 Stierncrona
 von Köhler
 Lillie
 Fuchs
 Sack
 von Düring
 Fitinghoff
 Strömfelt
 Grundel
 Stierncrantz
 von Dellwig
 von Knorring
 Adlerfelt
 Rosenstierna
 von Trautwetter
 von Löwenstern
 von Albedyl
 D'Albedyhll
 Koskull
 Ollonberg
 Roos
 Sture
 Cronström
 Funck
 Burguer von Ritterstein
 von Danckwardt
 Stackelberg
 Cronman
 Örnestedt
 Gyllenkrok
 Tegensköld
 Frisenheim
 von Mengden
 Wrangel af Adinal
 von Friesendorff
 Fehman
 von Gedda
 Yxkull
 Staël von Holstein
 Åkerhielm af Margrethelund
 von Kochen
 Löwen
 von Rosen
 von Buddenbrock
 Ehrenkrona
 Cederström
 Palmfelt
 Armfelt
 Bunge
 Lilliecreutz
 Ribbing af Koberg
 Reuterholm
 Ehrenpreus
 Wrangel af Sauss
 Palmstierna
 von Seth
 Broman
 von Nolcken
 Löwenhielm
 Hårleman
 Gyllengranat
 Rudenschöld
 Ridderstolpe
 von Grooth
 Barnekow
 von Kaulbars
 Åkerhielm af Blombacka
 Löwen
 Djurklou
 Kalling
 Stierneld
 Björnberg
 Grönhagen
 Strokirch
 Hastfer
 von Lantingshausen
 Gerdesköld
 von Roxendorff
 Gripenstierna
 Lagerfelt
 Manderström
 Lilliesvärd
 Tilas
 Adelswärd
 Hierta
 Rosir
 von Kothen
 de Geer af Leufsta
 Lagerbielke
 Falkenberg af Trystorp
 von Hermansson
 Klingspor
 von Blixen later von Blixen-Finecke
 von Axelson
 von Saltza
 Preis
 Klinckowström
 Marcks von Württemberg
 Wennerstedt
 Horn af Rantzien
 Adlermarck
 Ehrensvärd
 Wrangel von Brehmer
 Wallenstierna
 Sinclair
 De Geer af Tervik
 Hermelin
 Lillienberg
 Adelcrantz
 Sprengtporten
 Löwen
 Mannerheim
 Beck-Friis
 Wrangel af Sauss
 von Höpken
 Carpelan
 Rudbeck
 Silfverschiöld
 Örnsköld
 von Segebaden
 Raab
 Rappe
 von Hegardt
 Pfeiff
 von Rosen
 Schmiedefelt
 Falkenberg af Bålby
 Falkengréen
 Boije af Gennäs
 Ramel
 Ruuth
 Liljencrantz
 Celsing
 Du Rietz af Hedensberg
 von Nackreij
 Thott
 Alströmer
 Voltemat
 Fock
 von Lingen
 Maclean
 Zöge von Manteuffel
 Staël von Holstein
 Munck
 Carpelan
 af Ugglas
 De Geer af Finspång
 von Platen
 Toll (Swedish family)
 von Krassow
 von Stedingk
 von Rajalin
 Lilliehorn
 af Nordin
 Brauner
 Tawast
 Anckarsvärd
 Rosenblad
 von Ehrenheim
 Zibet
 Lagerheim
 af Wetterstedt
 af Puke
 Adlerbeth
 Silfversparre
 Adlercreutz
 Sandels
 von Engeström
 af Klercker
 von Döbeln
 Adlerberg
 Adlersparre
 Tersmeden
 af Håkansson
 Löfvenskjöld
 Lagerheim
 von Stedingk
 Nauckhoff
 von Willebrand
 Skjöldebrand
 Lagerbring
 Wirsén
 von Strokirch
 Björnstjerna
 von Schulzenheim
 von Rehausen
 Drufva
 von der Lancken von Wackenitz
 Fock
 Brändström
 Edelcrantz
 Nordenskjöld
 Lagerbring
 af Klinteberg
 Trolle
 Edelcreutz
 Haij
 Coyet
 von Platen
 Gyllensköld
 Ehrenborgh
 Ulfsparre
 de la Grange
 Lagerstråle
 von Paykull
 von Plomgren
 Nieroth
 Skjöldebrand
 Battram
 Bergenstråhle
 von Kantzow
 Reuterskiöld
 af Tibell
 von Vegesack
 von Schulzenheim
 Hierta
 Franc-Sparre
 d'Ohsson
 Vult von Steijern
 von Brinkman
 Berzelius
 von Weigel
 Gyllenhaal
 von Kræmer
 Nordenfalk
 Hochschild
 Peyron
 af Schmidt
 Nordensköld
 Tamm
 Gyllenhaal till Härlingstorp
 von Rosén
 Ihre
 von Beskow
 Bergenstråhle
 Braunerhielm
 Gripenstedt
 Ericson
 Bildt
 Nordenskiöld
 Dickson

Adliga ätter (Untitled Nobility) 
This is the list of Adliga ätter officially posted by the Riddarhuset in Stockholm, Sweden

 Lilliehöök af Fårdala
 Forstena-släkten
 Bååt
 Fleming
 Kyle
 Lillie af Greger Matssons ätt
 Sparre af Rossvik
 Bielke af Åkerö
 Ulfsparre af Broxvik, 1 unintroduced baronial
 Soop
 Bonde
 Horn af Kanckas
 Natt och Dag, unintroduced baronial
 Posse
 Ribbing
 Boije af Gennäs
 Hård af Segerstad
 Falkenberg af Trystorp
 Ulfeldt
 Holck
 Krabbe af Krageholm
 Urne
 Barnekow
 Ramel
 Walkendorff
 Tott
 Gädda
 Bille af Dybeck
 Gyllenstierna af Svaneholm
 Lindenov
 Björnklou
 Stålarm
 Ehrenstéen
 Lilliecrona
 Ekeblad
 Trolle
 Rosenstråle
 Carpelan
 Stiernkors
 Gyllenhjerta
 Hinsebergs-släkten
 Ållongren i Östergötland
 Kruse af Elghammar
 Lilliesparre af Fylleskog
 Rosladin
 Krabbe af Svaneby
 Gyllenanckar
 Frankelin
 Bratt af Höglunda
 Bock af Näs
 Roos af Hjelmsäter
 Rosenbielke
 Lake
 Gyllencreutz
 Berendes
 Ulf af Horsnäs
 Ikorn
 Rääf i Finland
 Hand
 Ille
 Kijl
 Månesköld af Seglinge
 Sack
 Tawast
 Lillietopp
 Lilliehöök af Gälared och Kolbäck
 Körning
 
 Cruus af Edeby
 Kafle
 von Scheiding
 Stubbe)
 Lillie af Ökna
 Lilliesparre af Kragstad
 Siöblad
 Yxkull
 Stierna
 von Warnstedt
 Store
 Gyllengrip
 Skytte i Finland
 Drake af Intorp
 Stolpe
 Örnflycht
 Jakobsköld
 Stuart
 Stråle af Ekna
 Tott af Skedebo
 Wildeman
 Drake af Hagelsrum
 Mörner
 Creutz
 Silfverhielm
 von Birckholtz
 Dufva i Finland
 Pauli
 Slatte
 Stålhandske
 Silfversparre
 Uggla
 Silfverbielke
 Oxehufwud
 Oxe
 Beurræus
 Falkenberg af Bålby
 Slang
 Ulfsax
 Ankar
 Lillie af Aspenäs
 Stake
 Ljuster
 Hjortö-släkten eller Ulfsparre
 Stackelberg
 Jägerhorn af Spurila
 Ållongren i Finland
 Gyllenhorn
 Lemnie
 Bagge af Berga
 
 Lilliestjelke
 Hierta
 Bagge af Boo
 Rosenquist
 Sting
 Ruuth i Finland
 Bure
 Böllja
 Mannersköld
 Rylanda och Häggatorps-släkten, eller Lindelöf af Kedom
 Munck af Fulkila
 Gyllenmärs
 Hästehufvud
 Frille
 Papegoja
 Hammarskjöld
 Crusebjörn
 Eketrä
 Plåt
 Kåse
 Tegel
 Svärd
 Svart
 Lindelöf
 Skalm i Finland
 Svinhufvud af Qvalstad
 Gyllensparre
 Bagge af Söderby
 Ållonsköld eller Härlingstorpssläkten
 Palm
 Sabelsköld
 Trana
 Sabel
 Ulffana
 Skytte af Sätra
 Ram
 Falck
 Lood i Småland
 Reuter af Skälboö
 Finckenberg
 Spåre
 Bröms
 Galle i Sverige
 Holst
 Rosenquist af Åkershult
 Melker Axelssons släkt
 Stöör
 Geete
 Gyllencornett
 Bååt eller Lennart Nilssons släkt
 Adler Salvius, unintroduced baronial
 Stiernfelt eller Grubbe
 Rosenstierna
 Lode från Livland
 Forbes af Lund
 Rotkirch
 Schulman 
 Strijk
 Oliveblad
 von der Linde
 Stiernhielm
 Grönberg
 Tungel
 Dufva i Vestergötland
 Silfverswärd
 Gyllenållon
 Sabelhierta
 Hästesko af Målagård
 Sabelfana
 Rääf i Småland
 Rosendufva
 Delphin
 Grijs
 Bäck i Finland
 Galle i Finland
 Klingspor
 Bärfelt
 Rosencrantz af Granhammar
 Armsköld
 Svinhufvud i Westergötland
 Creutzhammar
 Brand 
 Bähr
 Langman
 Björnram af Helgås
 Stewart
 Sabelstierna
 Dücker
 Hökeflycht
 Lund
 Ållon Finland
 Ödell eller Ödla
 Lind af Hageby
 Utter
 Crail
 Ramsay
 Gyllenlood
 Ekelöf
 Månesköld af Norge
 Grönfelt
 Fitinghoff
 Ankarfjell
 Starck
 Stråle af Sjöared
 Strömfelt
 Wädurhorn
 Jägerhorn af Storby
 Fogelhufvud
 Hästesköld
 Footangel
 Pilefelt
 Robertsson
 Sölfverarm
 Stårck
 Törnsköld
 Örnehufvud
 Anrep
 Patkull
 Bille
 Silfverpatron
 Gyllensvärd
 Duwall
 Philip
 Jordan
 Skalm i Finland
 Blåfield
 Poitz
 Bock af Bukkila
 Koskull
 Forbes
 Lillieström
 Jernlod
 Silfvercrona
 Pistol
 Lilliecrona
 Löfling
 Gyllenstråle
 Hästesko
 Svenske
 von Neüman
 Dachsberg
 Gyllenax
 Lind i Västergötland
 Planting sedermera Planting-Gyllenbåga
 Silfverlood
 Silfverstierna
 Stålman
 Garfwe
 Björnsköld
 Gyldenklou
 Rehnskiöld
 Ruuth i Västergötland
 Zelow
 Lilliebjelke
 Ankarsköld
 Boose
 Grothusen
 Ogilwie
 Hammarstierna
 Giös
 De la Motte
 Gyllengren
 Schildt
 Ikornsköld
 Silfverbögel
 Ekestubbe
 Hästesko-Fortuna
 Rosensköld
 Bråkenhusen
 Rosenschmidt
 Appelgren
 De Geer
 Stålhane
 Lilliebrunn
 Svanfelt
 Kohl
 Transehe von Roseneck
 Grissbach
 Bergenfelt
 Thomson
 Björnram
 Wachttorn
 Hjulhammar
 Blume (Blom)
 Printz
 Rodersköld
 Hildring
 Gärffelt
 Irving
 Årrhane
 Mannerhielm
 Anckarhielm
 Andeflycht
 Drakenberg
 Reuter
 Lofelt
 Stormhatt
 Sabelfelt
 Enhörning
 Blanckenfjell
 Igelström
 Pistolekors 
 Rosenberg
 von Schwalch
 Leuhusen
 Appelbom
 Rosenhielm
 Örneklou
 Rutensköld
 von Meijer
 Kuhlefelt
 Oljeqvist
 Stiernflycht
 Leijonstierna
 Svärdsköld
 Grubbe
 Graan
 Linderoth
 Lindegren
 Morgonstierna
 Fägerskiöld
 von Radeke
 Strussberg
 Falkengréen
 Lagerfelt
 Bröstfelt
 Gyllenfalk
 Gyllenpistol
 Svanestierna
 Rosenbom
 Ekegren
 Kugelhielm
 Örnevinge
 Loberg
 Wärnschöld
 de Laval
 Wudd
 Tornerefelt
 Björnhufvud
 Björnberg
 Klingenberg
 Drake af Torp och Hamra
 Rossfelt
 Hulshorst
 Blixencron
 Strömberg
 Wolffensköld
 Renhorn
 Leijonburg
 Dreffensköld
 Cantersten
 Palmkron
 Gladtsten
 Lünow
 Verdelet de Fornoy
 Udnie
 von Ridderhusen
 Silfverlåås
 Silfvergren
 Lindeberg
 Ekehielm
 Cronlood
 Sass
 Golawitz
 Grass 
 Silfverspåre
 Brandt
 Åkerfelt
 Gyldenär
 Bohl
 Leijonram
 Lagergréen
 Bråkensköld
 Gyllensting
 von Schlangenfeldt genannt Degingk, unintroduced baronial
 Kempensköld
 Pilegren
 Svanström
 Lagercrantz
 Silfverax
 Strusshielm
 Reuterfeldt
 Ramsvärd
 Krakenhoff
 Rosenbröijer
 Hillesköld
 Fahnehielm
 Klöfverfelt
 Danckwardt-Lillieström
 Sölfvermusköt
 Rutenfelt
 Fritz
 Lagercrantz
 von Weidenhaijn
 Welsk
 Hufvudskått
 Ollonberg
 von Chemnitz
 Gyllenbögel
 Rosenhand
 Björnefelt
 Landzberg
 Durell
 Urqvard
 Armlod
 Örnstierna
 Djurfelt
 Lilliestierna
 Wolfsberg
 Skytte
 Hirtenberg
 Jernsköld
 von Schaar
 Clerck
 Gyllenflög
 Sparrfelt
 Stierncreutz
 Taubenfelt
 von Faltzburg
 Lindorm
 Didron, unintroduced baronial
 Stålklinga
 Clerck
 Strussflycht
 Sinclair, unintroduced baronial
 Dromund
 Netherwood
 Wijnbladh
 Lenck
 Reutercrantz
 von Witten af Stensjö
 Dreffenfelt
 Nöding
 Skalm af Karelen
 Möller
 von Siegroth
 Aminoff, unintroduced baronial
 Silfversvan
 Armfelt
 Brandsköld
 von Krusenstierna
 Rosensabel
 Ridderhielm
 Niethoff
 Tranefelt
 Bär
 Volland von Lande
 Kuhlman
 Munck (af Sommernäs)
 Svärdfelt
 Bilesköld
 Stiernhöök
 Gyldenroos
 Coyet
 von Wingarten
 Stålhielm
 Ekenberg
 Bergsköld
 Printzensköld
 Lantzenfelt
 Lilliecrantz
 Willigman
 Blanckenfjell
 Granatenfelt
 Breitholtz
 Gairdner
 Behmer
 Reenfelt
 Skyttehielm
 Rosenlindt
 Foratt
 Kalmberg
 Pistolhjelm
 Örn
 Croneborg
 von Schrowe
 Stålhammar
 Lilliefelt
 Hufvudsköld
 Scott
 Wallenstedt
 Påhlman
 Storckenfeldt
 Kewenbrinck (Keffenbrinck von Rhene)
 
 Kinnemond
 von Quanten
 Solenblomma
 Silfwerbrand
 Bergengren
 Drakenhielm
 Fahnesköld
 von Main
 Makeléer
 Rithfelt
 Bäfverfeldt
 Lybecker
 Skarpenfelt, sedermera Skarp von Felt
 Harnesksköld
 Trafvenfelt
 Brennerfelt
 Bogg
 Bordon
 Rothlieb
 Påfvenfelt
 Cederqvist
 Grottenfelt
 von Streitberg
 von Snoilsky
 Hoffstedter von Kühnberg
 Rålambstierna
 Drakenstierna
 von Gerstenberg
 Orrfelt
 Chounfelt
 Reuterberg
 Järnefelt
 Ryttersköld
 de Courtin
 von Hartwigk
 Bohm
 Sparfvenfelt
 Forbes
 Schillerfelt
 Dusensköld
 von Bönhardt
 Butterlin
 Axehielm
 Torwigge
 Lindeström
 Teet
 de Laignier
 Skraggensköld
 Sneckenfelt
 von der Sund
 Cabeljau
 Feltberg
 Teetgren
 von Schröer
 Pereswetoff-Morath
 von Burghausen
 Kleihe
 Barclay
 Wulfrath (von Wolffradt)
 von Nieroth
 Schletzer
 Lilliesköld
 Crantzfelt
 Berling
 Rosenstielke
 Rosenschantz
 Stiernstråle
 Rennerfelt
 Gyllennieroth
 Ranck
 Gyllenpatron
 Heidensköld
 Lagercrona
 Lagersköld
 Klöfverskjöld
 Rosenflycht
 Hillebrand
 Lillieholm
 Canterhielm
 de la Chapelle
 Eneskjöld
 Rosenholm
 Broman
 von Kysel
 von Kreijenfels
 Strömsköld
 Leijoncrona
 Bosin
 Lagerqvist
 Norfelt
 Rosencröel
 von Numers
 Lilliesköld
 Reeth
 Gyldencrantz
 Rising
 Uttermarck
 Sylvius
 Wrång
 von Beijer
 Palmgren
 Leijonberg
 Rosenfelt
 Plenningsköld
 Duréel
 Ulfvenklou
 von Qvickelberg
 Wattrang
 Lillieqvist
 Burensköld
 von Lillienhielm
 von Weiker
 Edenberg
 Gyldenbring
 von Schäwenbach
 Gyllenstake
 Flygge
 Svanenberg
 Strussköld
 Påfvenhielm
 Beckerfelt
 Sinclair, unintroduced baronial
 
 Planting-Bergloo
 Hillebard
 Stöltenhielm
 Tandefelt
 Rundeel
 Blanck
 Klingebail
 von Pegauberg
 von Sahlfelt
 Gripensperr
 Ögnelood
 Hjortfelt
 Primeroos
 Tornerefelt
 von Becker
 von Kaulbars
 Rosendal
 Möller sedermera Möllerswärd
 Cronberg
 Olivecrantz
 Lithman
 Lützow
 Rosenacker
 Rosenholtz
 Hägerstierna
 Clo
 Winstrup
 Gyllenadler
 Siöhielm
 Palmstruch
 Leijoncrantz
 Örnestedt, unintroduced baronial
 Skunck
 Klingstedt
 Österling
 Dahlepil
 Månestierna
 Skytte
 Du Rietz
 von Liebstorff
 Rosenklinga
 Siölöw
 Palmqvist
 Enefelt
 Wäsenberg
 Gyllenspetz
 Ulfsköld
 Gyllenpamp
 Kempenfelt
 Appelman
 Bildt
 von Vegesack
 von Hirscheit (von Hirschheydt)
 Orcharton
 Mel
 Hilchen
 von der Osten genannt Sacken
 von Güntersberch
 Stackelberg
 von Post
 Ulf i Finland
 Brunow
 Ruuth
 Huggut
 Sölfverlood
 von Rodenburg
 Rosenfelt
 Brask
 Nötebom
 Silfverharnesk
 von Wieder
 Hirschenstierna
 Anckarhielm
 von Wallich
 Prytz
 Skeckta
 Skogh
 af Ellerntorp
 Rosenmüller
 Leijonfelt
 Grubbenhielm
 Hoghusen
 Franc
 Danckwardt
 Kock von Crimstein
 Cremer
 Gyllengranat
 Skutenberg
 Grundel
 Ekensteen
 Modée
 Törnecrantz
 von Mentzer
 von Dunten
 Barck
 von Essen af Zellie
 von Köbberer
 Fraser
 Lillieberg
 Gripenklo
 Tawastén
 von Borneman
 Stropp
 Tigerstierna
 Adlerhielm
 Lützow
 Taube
 von Siegroth
 Mellin
 de Moucheron
 Andersson
 Esping
 Nassokin
 Rigeman
 von Gröninger
 Crafoord
 Treileben
 Bruce
 Reiher
 Liwensten
 Cronman
 von Gertten
 von Sternbach
 Schmiedefelt
 Brunell
 Barnsköld
 Svärdfelt
 Bagghufvud (von Baggo)
 Lindtman
 von Lillienthal
 Fechtenberg
 Stiernelodh
 Örnestedt
 Granatenburg
 Brenner
 de Besche
 Wagner
 Charpentier, unintroduced baronial
 Stegman
 von Greiffencrantz
 Arenfelt
 von der Deilen
 Örnecrantz
 Starenflycht
 Ehrenberg
 Du Rees
 Neümeijer
 Mannerfelt
 Gyllenhammar
 von Hagendorn
 Leijonancker
 Twengerhielm
 Klingenstierna
 Silfverström
 Belfrage
 Ehrenskiöld
 Leijonhielm
 Feltreuter
 Cronström
 von Schönfelt
 Skyttenhielm
 Plaan
 von Böckeln
 Lillieflycht
 Lagerhjelm
 Falkenhagen
 Bergenhjelm
 von Löwenburg
 Thumb von Weingarten
 Siöberg
 Sneckensköld
 Lillienhoff
 Beck sedermera Beck-Friis
 von Stockman
 Löschern von Hertzfelt 
 von Wedel
 von Heisen
 Rutencrantz
 Cletzer
 von Rohr
 von Krefelt
 Knorring
 King
 Zimmerman
 Goës
 Barneken
 Gyllenhaal
 Gripensköld
 von Campenhausen, unintroduced baronial
 Tigerhielm
 Reenstierna
 Trotzenfelt
 Gripenstierna
 Douglies
 von Graffenthal
 Ehrencrantz
 Storm
 Lideman
 Funck
 Falkensten
 Nisbeth
 Wisocki-Hochmuth
 von Vicken
 Bennet
 von der Osten genannt Sacken
 Werdenhoff
 Staël von Holstein
 Rosenmarck
 Rosenström
 von Eich
 Lilliering
 Rehnberg
 Holmer
 Leijonkloo
 Svanehielm
 Sneckenberg
 Tigerklou
 Rosenhoff
 Ehrenhielm
 von Porten
 Wattrang
 Utterklo
 Ahlefelt
 Canterstierna
 Törnhielm
 von Pufendorff, unintroduced baronial
 Stierncrantz
 Gyllencartou
 Thewitz
 Karlström
 Stockenström
 Tessin
 Flygge
 von Gegerfelt
 Gyllenkrok
 Leijonsten
 Meijerfeldt
 Ehrenstrahl, unintroduced baronial
 Cronsköld
 Palmström
 Adlercrona
 Kanterberg
 Strömberg
 Ehrenklo
 Rudebeck
 Hägerflycht
 Wernle
 Gripenwaldt
 Leijonberg
 Ehrenskiöld
 Buchner
 Ehrencrona
 Gyllencrona
 von Campenhausen
 Rothåf
 von Brobergen
 von Reimers
 Gyllenharnesk
 Lilliemarck
 Fägerstierna
 Lilliestierna
 Furumarck
 Ehrenfelt
 von Ellswichshusen
 Örnfelt
 Reenhielm
 Appelroth
 Lillieborg
 Cuypercrona
 Ankarström sedermera Löwenström
 Leuhusen
 von Boij
 Svanlood
 Gyllenspak
 Gyllenskepp
 Cock
 Appelberg
 Gerner
 Werwing
 Granberg
 Heidenfelt
 von Rosenfeldt
 Spalding
 Helffreich
 Apoloff
 Myhr
 von Jordan
 Gripenflycht
 Gyllencaschett
 de la Grange
 Adlerhoff
 Gyllenståhl
 Gripenmarck
 Cedercrantz
 Berghman
 Zittelberg
 Leijonsvärd
 Lydinghielm
 Laurin
 Sparfelt
 Tegensköld
 Grönhagen
 Jäger o von Schulzenjäger
 Gripenberg
 von Brömssen 
 Tunderfelt
 von Streitbach
 von Preutz
 Gyllenbreider
 Gyllentrost
 Hupenfelt
 Rosbach
 Troz
 Gyllentorner
 Ramfelt
 Franc
 de Besche
 Pfeiff
 Drakenfelt
 Ankargrip
 Tranefelt
 Willemsens
 von der Wettering
 Wardlau
 Ehrenflycht
 Gyllenroth
 Bråkensköld
 Ridderberg
 von Kemphen
 Lauw
 von Dellingshausen
 Sahlefelt
 Falkenhielm
 Hultengren
 Mannerberg
 Karlström
 Krabbenström
 Sinclair
 von Runneberg
 von Hörmansfelt
 Djurklow
 Drommel
 Smittenhielm
 Kinninmundt
 Fuchs von Bühlstein
 Sölfverklinga
 Gütrie
 Specht
 von Halle
 Baggensköld
 Örneberg
 Queckfeldt
 Cronacker
 Gyllenstorm
 Reuterhielm
 Cronacker
 Grubbenfelt
 Ehrenfels
 von Suurman
 Åkerhielm
 Silnecker
 Billingsköld
 Oldekop
 Örneström
 Silfverklou
 Palmsköld
 von Eisen
 von Kothen
 Granatenhielm
 Bäckhusen
 Brase
 Losköld
 Wennerstedt
 Schmiedeberg
 Schantz
 Ehrenbusch
 Adlersten
 Trotzig
 Riddersköld
 Wulfvenstierna, unintroduced baronial
 Ridderschantz
 Rosenlew (Rosenlew)
 Ehrenkrook
 Lagercrantz
 Silfvercrantz
 Franc
 Myrtengren
 Lithman
 Planting-Bergloo
 Leijonwall
 Gyllenspång
 Güntherfelt
 von Grotjohan
 Klinckow von Friedenschildt
 Hilletan
 Gyllenpalm
 Nohlanvähr
 Pistolskiöld
 Hougenfelt
 von Rothausen
 Drakensköld
 Gripendahl
 Gyllenberg
 von Weissenfels
 Grotenfelt
 Hammarhjelm
 Wallenstierna
 Wästfelt
 Travenhielm
 von Franck
 Bogeman
 Stiernhoff
 von Schwartzenhoff
 Adlersköld
 Nyberg
 von Gisler
 Witting
 Ehrenstierna
 Furubom
 Sternburg
 Tersér el Terschère
 von Öller
 Lilliegren
 Törnefelt
 Schönberg
 Hammarberg
 Billingberg
 Bråkenhielm
 Schönström
 Weinholtz
 Piper
 von Strokirch
 von Gerdes
 Adlerberg
 Cederström
 Cederberg
 Örnhjelm
 Leijonström
 Sneckenberg
 von Lissenhaim
 Hammarström
 Ruuth
 von der Lieth
 Wetzler
 von Pfuel
 Silfverskiöld
 von Daden
 Reutervall
 Lagerstierna
 Reutermarck
 von Bildsten
 Freijbourg
 von Schattau
 Roxendorff
 Strokirch
 Mannerstedt
 von Grooth
 Schmedeman
 Hackersköld
 Tigerschiöld
 Leijonflycht
 Wiederholt von Weidenhofen
 Grönhjelm
 Braun
 Leijonmarck
 von Stegling
 Ringstedt
 Königsfelt
 von Trautwetter
 Stiernborg
 Lindelöf
 Starensköld
 Jägerskiöld
 Ankarklo
 Freidenfelt
 Lorfvensköld
 Cronstedt
 Ankarfelt
 Leijonhoff
 Tawaststjerna
 Lindcrantz
 Ehrenborg
 Nordenhielm
 Sölfverberg
 Lagerberg
 Treffenberg
 Palmfelt, unintroduced baronial
 Gyllenhöök
 Gyllenstedt
 Cederschiöld
 Leijondahl
 Gripenklo
 Fabritius
 Hökensköld
 Offerman el von Opfern
 Ehrnrooth
 Ehrenankar
 Caméen
 von Schmieden
 von Walter och Winblad von Walter
 Gyldenboij
 Edelfelt
 Mörling
 Adlerström
 Snack
 von Fleissner
 von Maschkow
 von Wilckenschildt
 de Corroset
 Riddermarck
 Sparrin
 Sackensköld
 Ankarstråle
 Lagermarck
 Ankarstierna
 Ankarstierna
 Ankarcrantz
 Ankarcreutz
 Blomensköld
 Wernfelt
 von Ehrenthal
 Hjärne, unintroduced baronial and comital
 Schulte von Ritterfelt
 von Meijerhelm
 Cederstierna
 Lilliesvärd
 Ridderkorp
 Tungelfelt o Wolberg von Tungelfelt
 Gyllenström
 Arensköld
 Adlerborg
 Ridderstierna
 Höökenberg
 Rahnhielm
 Hogg
 Pahl
 von Meurman
 Brehmer
 Broman
 Strömner
 Fredenhielm
 von Bilang
 Stiernström
 Lilliegranat
 Lohreman
 Leijonbielke
 Bock från Lahmes 
 Lagerblad
 Leijonflycht
 Greiffenschütz
 Gyllenschmidt
 Granfeldt från Dal
 Falkenfelt
 Kirstein
 Rydingstierna
 Klintenhielm
 Stiernberg
 Krebs
 von Westphal
 Haij
 Leijonsparre
 Blix
 Adlerstierna
 Ankarloo
 Ehrenstedt
 Adlercrantz
 Wallrawe
 Sparrsköld
 Bäärnhielm
 Mannerstierna
 Cedercrona
 Simmingsköld
 von Scheffer
 Westenhielm
 Canonhielm
 von Berco
 Wallenhielm
 von Weinberg
 von Bysing
 Gyllensköld
 Ridderstorm
 Mannerburg
 Reuterswärd
 Elfvencrona
 Lilliengrip
 Hägerfelt
 Silnecker
 Polchow
 Steb
 Godenhielm
 Reuterholm
 Elfving
 Riddersvärd
 Cronmarck
 Linroth
 Adlerstedt
 Westersköld
 Ehrenstolpe
 Gripenstedt
 Tigerstedt
 Lagerström
 Lagerbom
 Spofvenhielm
 Feltstierna
 Ridderström
 von Strokirch
 Adlerflycht
 von Berchner
 Karlsten
 von der Wolffesburg
 Schmidt
 
 Gyllenholm
 Palmcrantz
 Ehrenström
 Utterhielm
 Stiernklo
 de la Grange
 Palmstierna
 Lindeblad
 Leijonstråle
 Osenhjelm
 Stierneroos
 von Lusten
 von Rudbeck
 de Besche
 Tollerhielm
 von Schantz
 de Behm
 Eding
 Heerdhielm
 Grubbensköld
 Mannerheim
 Ehrenmarck
 Adlerklo
 Lillieblad
 Svansköld
 Gerdes
 Lillienstrahl
 Rotenburg
 von Löwenstern
 Prytz
 Hallenstedt
 Tranhielm
 Adlerfelt
 Peringskiöld
 Wattrang
 Enhielm
 von Köhnnigstedt
 Blixenstierna
 Wohlberg
 Pihlcrantz
 Frölich
 von Wedderkop
 Gersdorff 
 von Stefken
 Rappe
 Wadenfelt
 von Kochen
 Schauman
 Iserhielm
 von Heinen
 Franckenhielm
 Granatenflycht
 von Braunjohan
 Transchiöld
 Langenhielm
 Girsström
 von Burman
 von Spången
 Bergengren
 de la Vallée
 de Besche
 von Kathen
 Lohielm
 Siöstierna
 Kuylenstierna
 Wallensten
 Söderhielm
 Sperreuter
 Brehmsköld
 Nordsköld
 Gyllenskog
 Gyllenflycht
 Brunsköld
 Ehrenpreus
 Weidenhielm
 Leijonstolpe
 Tranhielm
 Ahlehielm
 Stierneld
 Tharmoth
 Gyllenfelt
 Hellenstierna
 Broméen
 Stiernanckar
 Falkenklo
 Flintsten
 von Schmitt
 von Linde
 Streithammel
 Ehrenbielke
 Rosentwist
 Kuhlhielm
 Hasselbom
 Leijongren
 Ridderfelt
 Leijoncreutz
 Cederborg
 Ridderbjelke
 Ruschenfelt
 Ehrencreutz
 von Dobrokowsky
 Engelcrona
 Söderhielm
 von Gavel
 von Borgen
 Königsheim
 von Maneken
 Stiernstolpe
 Blomström
 Hägerhjelm
 von Engelbrechten
 Muhl
 Bongenhielm
 Rosenstedt
 Ehrenman
 Tessmar
 Törnflycht
 Hildebrand
 Lagerstedt
 Stierndahl
 Parmand
 Kalling
 Odelstierna
 Göthe, unintroduced baronial
 Ljungfelt
 von Brandt
 Rudbeck
 Brommenstedt
 Riddercrantz
 Kreij
 Stiernblad
 Hårleman
 Silfverstråle
 Dannerhielm
 Stiernadler
 de Frietzcky
 von Brandten
 Stiernmarck
 Lagerbielke
 Lilliecreutz
 Starckhufvud
 von Porat
 Clerck
 Daurer
 Stierncrona
 Lillienadler
 Adlercreutz
 Wadenstierna
 Ehrenspetz
 Lohe
 Lagerkrook
 Hermelin
 Manderström
 Wingeflycht
 Hermann
 Greiffenheim
 Wattrang
 von Staude
 Sodenstierna
 von Göeding
 Hjelmborg
 Cronfelt
 Bethun
 Caménhielm
 Cederstedt
 Feif
 Roxendorff
 Zülich
 von Löwenheim
 Adlermarck
 Eksköld
 Lagerflycht, twice unintroduced baronial
 Danckwardt
 Råfelt
 von Höpken
 Klinckowström, unintroduced baronial
 von Graman 
 Ehrenhoff
 Ädelberg
 Törne
 Rothlöben
 Insenstierna
 Knipercrona
 Tisensten
 Wennerstierna
 von Brunner
 von Ertman
 Treffenhielm
 Ridderborg
 Skraggensköld
 Gyllengahm
 Lillienberg, 1 unintroduced baronial
 Stiernschantz
 von Hoffdahl
 Gyllenbjelke
 Hammarfelt
 Gadde
 Zeedtz
 Stralenberg
 Stobée
 von Reuterholm
 Adelstierna
 Ekfelt
 Törnstierna
 von Neügebauer
 Lybecker
 Giertta
 Mannercrantz
 Bunge
 von Dahlheim
 Odelström
 Gripenborg
 Hjelmberg
 Baas
 Loos
 Kijl
 Lillienstam
 Wachschlager
 Keder
 Rudenhielm
 von Soldan
 von Eccard
 Skutenhielm
 von Baumgarten
 Brenner
 von Unge
 Bilberg
 Hederhielm
 Stedt
 Adelcrantz
 Henck
 Rydingsvärd
 de Briant
 von Stade
 Schenfelt
 Högger
 Riben
 Jegerhjelm
 von Burguer
 Ulfhielm
 Ridderstråle
 König
 von Hylteen
 Bousquet
 Enanderhielm
 Cederholm
 Sandberg
 Hoffman
 Rosenborg
 Rutensparre
 Brauner
 von Lindeblad
 Ridderstolpe
 Zander
 Schmoll
 Strömstierna
 Gathenhielm
 Riddergroll
 von Roepsdorff
 Lagercreutz
 Hjelmstierna
 Göthenstierna
 von Utfall
 von Bruse
 Stenflycht
 von Seth
 Stierngranat
 de Silentz
 Tham
 von Utfall
 Maull
 Cedersparre
 Fixenhielm
 Frisenheim
 Polhem
 Ehrenbill
 Gyllenschruf
 Linnerhielm
 von Witten
 von Döbeln
 Bergenstierna
 Jerlström
 Ratzwill
 Lindenstedt
 Lindsfelt
 von Tholijn
 Simzon
 Blosenhielm
 Gyllenram
 von Schulzenhielm
 Ridderheim
 Leijel
 Leijel
 Leijel
 Ankarcrona
 Fröberg
 von Hegardt
 Fägerhierta
 Falker
 Götherhielm
 Heldenhielm
 von Bocken
 Ehrensvärd
 Hederstierna
 Wagner
 von Reichenbach
 Wilsdorff
 von Greiff
 Hertz
 Möllerstierna
 Leijonbrinck
 von Wallwijk, unintroduced baronial and comital
 Palmhielm
 Hoffenstierna
 von Flygarell
 Dahlfelt
 Lilliestruss
 Drufva
 Starenfelt
 Palmencrona
 Celsing
 Fehman
 Cederbielke, unintroduced baronial
 Cederstråhle
 Segerberg
 Cedermarck
 Kröningssvärd
 Tigerström
 de Frumerie
 Silfvercreutz
 Borg
 Litheim
 Thimerhielm
 Linnercrantz
 Wetterstierna
 von Otter
 Ladau
 Zengerlein
 Rosenadler
 Lindencrona
 von Carlsson, unintroduced baronial
 Boneauschiöld
 Steuch
 Rudenschöld
 Mannercrona
 Blomfelt
 Raab
 von Seulenberg
 Rittercrantz
 Rosensparre
 von Gardemein
 Segersköld
 Lannerstierna
 Voltemat
 von Heijne
 Segerfelt
 von Bradke
 Friedenreich
 Swedenborg
 Ehrenlund
 Braunerhielm
 Cederfelt
 Gyllenbååt
 von Block
 Panso
 Palmcreutz
 Flach
 Meldercreutz
 Nordenstråle
 Uggelklo
 Adelhielm
 Dreffling
 Grundelstierna
 Gripenschütz
 von Roland
 Svedenheim
 Tilas
 Bergenadler
 Elgenstierna
 Dimborg
 Lagerborg
 von Lietzen
 Rosenstolpe
 Plantenstedt
 Bielkenhielm
 Ehrenadler
 Olivecrona
 Blixenstråle
 Benzelstierna
 Wulfcrona
 Lagerstolpe
 Svab
 Adlerheim
 Lindcreutz
 Hedersköld
 Adlerbaum
 Reuterskiöld
 Rudbeck
 von Strömborg
 von Sallern
 Cederflycht
 Silfverstedt
 Ridderstad
 Örncrona
 Löth-Örnsköld
 Strömhielm
 Stiernheim
 Borgenstierna
 von Bahr
 Segercrona
 von Segerdahl
 Schmilinsky
 Kunckel
 Reenstråle
 Pihlhielm
 Tornérhielm
 von Hökerstedt
 von Reichel
 Törnecreutz
 Svedenstierna
 Löweneck
 Carlheim (sedermera Carlheim-Gyllensköld
 Nordenfelt
 Möhlman
 Glansenstierna
 Lundeblad
 von Ebbertz
 Leijonadler
 Winter
 Hempel
 von Henel
 Lilliehorn
 Sternleuw
 von Ehrenclou
 Klingfelt
 Adlerbielke
 Jernfeltz
 Braunersköld
 Estenberg
 Stierncrona af Söderby
 Riddercrona
 Ehrenfalck
 Ehrenstam
 Lostierna
 von Goltz
 Rosengrip
 Wagenfelt
 Lundenstierna
 Cederstolpe
 Hoenstierna
 Riddercreutz
 von Castanie
 Östner
 Köppen
 Ehrensparre
 Cronsparre
 Bergenstråhle
 Nordencreutz
 Ehrenpåle
 Nordenheim
 Lindestolpe
 Ekenstierna
 Törnebladh
 Blomcreutz
 Arenhielm
 Ekesparre
 Silfverskog
 Adelswärd
 von Walden
 Sandelhielm
 von Gedda
 Dryssel
 von Nackreij
 von Boisman
 von Björnbourg
 Stenholm
 von Drake
 Fägerstråle
 Dalman
 Dagström
 Adlerfors
 Ingelotz
 von Wulffschmidt
 Günther
 Schulzendorff
 von Christiersson
 Marcks von Würtemberg
 von Burguer
 von Walcker
 Standaerhielm
 Weili
 von Scharin
 Adlerbeth
 von Bratt
 Gyllenecker
 von Caméen
 Hallenborg
 Bungencrona
 Kalitin
 Löwe (Löwen)
 Sprengtport
 Wolffelt 
 von Schwartzer
 von Wachenfeldt
 Wendel
 von Conowen
 Brunhielm
 Wigelstierna
 Reuterstierna
 von Ehrenheim
 Hjelm
 Svedenhielm
 von Olthoff
 Hedenstierna
 Segerstierna
 von Scheven
 Preis
 Tallberg
 Löwenhult
 Ehrenmalm
 Reutercrona
 Strålenhielm
 Ehrenfelt
 Grüner
 Browald
 Adlerstråhle
 Segercrantz (sedermera Segercrantz af Såtevalla)
 Wallrawe
 Schmiterlöw
 Marschalck
 Wrangel af Sauss
 von Dellwig
 Brummer
 Rubzoff
 Berch
 von Schwerin af Spantekow
 von Drachstedt
 Toll
 Meck
 von Blixen
 von Bauman
 von Rehausen
 Gyllenqvist
 von Borneman
 von Drenteln
 von Düben
 Blomstedt
 von Yhlen
 Psilanderhielm
 Ridderhierta
 von Rosen
 Löwenhielm
 von Issendorff
 von Bromell
 von Hofsten
 Caménsköld
 Munsterhjelm
 von Törne
 Bruncrona
 von Scholten
 Fredenstierna
 Riddersven
 Hasenkampff
 von Baltzar
 Nordenborg
 Stiernspetz
 von Nolcken 
 von Schwerin af Grellenberg
 Wiebel, unintroduced baronial
 von Freudenberg
 Stjernvall
 von Westerling
 Lindheim
 von Dittmer
 Nordenadler
 Nordenflycht
 Adlerstolpe
 Abrahamsson
 Bildensköld
 Stiernsparre
 Harenc
 von Cron
 Rühl
 Brandholtz
 von Törne
 Nordensvärd
 Franckenheim
 Strömcrona
 Cronhawen
 Dahlcrona
 von Schoting
 Ridderhof
 von Lang
 Klick 
 von Willebrand, unintroduced baronial
 Törnrose
 von Korbmacher
 von Brehmer
 Kloo
 Ridderboll
 Trollenfelt
 von Heland
 Edenhielm
 von Buddenbrock
 von Nerès
 Hastfer
 Fock
 Maydell
 Virgin
 von Saltza
 Wrangel af Sage och Waschel
 Barohn
 von Segebaden
 Hertell
 von Böhnen
 Brummer
 de Frese
 von Törne
 von Engelhardt
 Wrangel af Fall
 von Lantingshausen 
 von Hartmansdorff
 Ridderstedt
 von Marqvard
 Dahlstierna
 Löwenfels
 von Ganschou
 Stenfelt
 Morman
 von Stauden
 von Rappolt
 Ehrenpohl
 Wallencrona
 von Morian
 Jennings
 von Lingen
 Möllerheim
 Carleson
 Malmerfelt
 Rosenstam
 von Hauswolff
 Cronsvärd
 von Stenhagen
 Linderstedt
 Hummelhielm
 Arnell
 Adelheim
 Gerdesköld
 Wefverstedt
 Vult von Steijern
 Carlsköld
 Nordencrantz
 Löfvenskjöld
 von Stiernman
 von Blessingh
 von Kemna
 von Hermansson
 von Plessen
 Cunninghame
 Piper
 Ehrenschantz
 Olivecreutz
 Beijerhjelm
 von Rajalin
 Wallén
 von Rosen
 Engelcrantz
 Mannerhierta
 von Benning
 Zöge von Manteuffel
 Horn af Rantzien
 Psilanderskjöld, unintroduced baronial
 Nordenskiöld
 von Eggers, unintroduced baronial
 von der Lieth
 Pechlin
 von Rädeken
 Berg von Linde
 von Strussenfelt
 von Essen
 von Fieandt
 de Carnall, unintroduced baronial
 von Platen
 Ridderstam
 von Qvillfelt
 Ehrengranat
 Stålsvärd
 Hårleman
 Hercules
 von Björnmarck
 Wahlfelt
 von Eckstedt
 von Oldenskiöld
 Lagersvärd
 Kanefehr
 von Haren
 von Stockenström, unintroduced baronial and comital
 Rückersköld
 Alströmer
 Silfverstolpe
 Tersmeden
 von Schaeij
 von Hagelberg
 Bergenskjöld
 von Svab
 von Dalin
 von Östfelt
 Odencrants
 von Engeström
 von Kiörning
 Nordenstam
 von Aulæwill
 von Plomgren
 von Schening
 de Bruce
 von Oelreich
 Clementeoff
 von Essen
 von Stahlen
 von Kræmer
 Montgomery
 Ehrenstråhle
 von Göben
 von Matérn
 Pinello
 Ankarcrona
 von Holmer
 Rosencrantz
 Finlaij
 Gyllensvaan
 Schedvin
 Rosir
 Mackenzie af Macleod
 Segercrantz
 Granfelt
 Scheffer
 von Knorring
 Freijtag
 Paijkull
 Brakel
 Fredenheim
 Nordenstolpe
 Wallencreutz
 Heijkenskjöld
 Schützercrantz
 Nordenankar
 Spaldencreutz
 Lilliestråle
 Adlersparre
 le Febure
 Ferrner
 Skiöldebrand
 Lagerstråle
 Gripenbjelke
 Lillienanckar
 af Bjerkén
 af Palén
 Grewesmöhlen
 Schröderstierna
 Falkenstedt
 Adlerwaldt
 af Sillén
 Hisinger
 af Malmsten
 von Schulzenheim
 Gripenstråle
 Sandels
 Sköldarm
 af Stenhoff
 af Söderling
 af Geijerstam
 Liljencrantz
 Hiort af Ornäs
 Rosenblad
 Harmensen
 Gyllenstam
 Hallencreutz
 Björnstjerna
 af Forselles
 af Wanoch
 Conradi
 Hertzenhielm
 von Axelson
 Kjerrmansköld
 Stiernstam
 von Heidenstam
 af Sotberg
 Sernsköld
 Lütkeman
 Adelsköld
 von Deutschlender
 von Ziegler
 von Liphardt
 Balguerie
 Adlerbrandt
 Cederbaum
 von Stapelmohr
 Wallenstråle
 von Lagerlöf
 von Troil
 Sanderskiöld
 von Celse
 Cederstam
 Ihre
 von Linné
 von Rosenheim
 Schröderheim
 Rönnow
 von Stierneman
 Noringer
 von Reiser
 Furuhjelm
 Hultenheim
 Stjernswärd
 von Arbin
 Rosén von Rosenstein
 af Botin
 Adlerstam
 af Grubbens
 von Schéele
 Wettercrona
 Lagerbring
 af Dittmer
 Nordenfalk
 af Winklerfelt
 Fredensköld
 Hedersvärd
 Crusenstolpe
 af Darelli
 Mannerstråle
 Plommenfelt
 af Petersens
 Malmsköld
 Pollet
 Kjerrulf von Wolffen
 af Huss
 Hederstam
 von Wright
 Toll
 Almfelt
 von Konow
 Langenskiöld
 Mannerskantz
 von Born
 af Alnord
 von Köhler 
 Ribben
 Salsvärd
 af Chapman
 af Enehielm
 Adelborg
 von Zansen
 Wrangel
 af Wetterstedt
 af Sandeberg
 Ehrenpalm
 von Röök
 von Francken
 Elfcrona
 von Kruus
 Segerstråle
 Hisingsköld
 Huusgafvel
 Baer
 Holmcreutz
 af Trolle
 Faxell
 Gustafschöld
 af Donner
 Anckarsvärd
 Printzenstierna
 af Ugglas
 Sjöholm
 Reuterstam
 Nordenswan
 Stiernefelt
 Bergenkloot
 af Thunberg
 Lagerheim
 Melanderhielm
 Nauckhoff
 von Jacobsson
 Lillienheim
 Sebalt
 Zibet
 von Hintzenstern
 Standertskjöld
 Segerheim
 von Platen
 af Låstbom
 af Acrel
 Orrsköld
 af Klercker
 de Bedoire
 Printzsköld
 Maule
 de Peijron
 von Carisien
 Rosenschütz
 Seton
 Anckarheim
 von Moltzer
 Liljensparre
 Stiernecreutz
 Rosensvärd
 af Nordin
 Bergencreutz
 af Cristiernin
 Risellschöld
 Krabbe
 von Hohenhausen
 Liljenstolpe
 af Uhr
 Edelcrantz
 Bérard
 Holmberg de Beckfelt
 Burenstam
 af Hasselgren
 von Tetzloff
 af Wingård
 Munck af Rosenschöld
 af Zellén
 af Flodin
 von Asp
 Wallquist
 Nordenstierna
 Dahlesköld
 af Puke
 Gedda
 von Stedingk
 Lidströmer
 Mouradgea d'Ohsson
 Lorichs
 af Schenbom
 von Langen
 von Sticht
 Lindersköld
 af Håkansson
 Edelsvärd
 Wärnhjelm
 Ankarsparre
 af Segerström
 Mannerstam
 Gripensvärd
 af Tibell
 af Klint
 von Wahrendorff
 von Kosboth
 af Klinteberg
 af Melin
 Helvig
 Edelcreutz
 Broberger
 Åkerstein
 Brändström
 Edelstam
 Wasastjerna
 af Strübing
 Löwenborg
 Bergstedt
 Hallenstjerna
 Schürer von Waldheim
 Möllerhjelm
 Zacco
 Gahn af Colquhoun
 Battram
 af Schultén
 af Leopold
 von Brinkman
 af Harmens
 af Lehnberg
 Börtzell 
 Nordenbjelke
 Sergel
 Haak
 af Agardh
 Murray
 von Dardel
 von Weigel
 Rothoff
 af Ekenstam
 af Wirsén
 Wirsén
 Kantzow
 Palmsvärd
 Sylvander
 von Stedingk
 d'Orchimont
 von Breda
 af Ekstedt
 Hagströmer
 af Burén
 Fredenstam
 Ekorn
 Holmstedt
 von Cardell, unintroduced baronial
 af Schmidt
 Palin
 Tegmansköld
 von der Lancken von Wackenitz
 von Afzelius
 Clairfelt
 von Rosén
 Hadorph
 von Koch
 von Hedenberg
 von Stahl
 von Schulzen
 af Forsell
 Quiding
 Brandel
 af Brinkman
 Dorchimont
 von Holst
 af Malmborg
 af Pontin
 von Geijer
 Nordewall
 af Georgii
 af Wåhlberg
 af Kullberg
 af Borneman
 Hegardt
 von Lindecreutz
 von Schinkel
 af Robson
 Hochschild
 Edelcrona
 af Wannquist
 Björkenstam
 Hagelstam
 von Feilitzen
 von Diederichs
 Sjöcrona
 Nieroth
 Lefrén
 Berzelius
 Ljungsvärd
 af Callerholm
 af Tannström
 af Lefrén
 af Robsahm
 von Prinzencreutz
 Akrell
 af Gillner
 af Klintberg
 af Risells
 af Rolén
 af Lundblad
 Boy
 Gyllenheim
 Westring
 af Edholm
 von Heideman
 af Funck
 Boltenstern
 de Camps
 Tamm
 af Billbergh
 von Beskow
 Spenger
 af Jochnick
 Skogman, unintroduced baronial
 Peyron
 af Ekström
 von Sydow
 von Hennigs
 af Tuneld
 af Ström
 af Dalström
 Grip
 Rabenius
 Peijron
 Ekströmer
 von Tuné
 von Schinkel
 Ammilon
 Fåhræus
 Malmborg
 Westerstrand
 Åkerman
 Nerman
 Sandströmer
 Isberg
 Ericson
 Fåhræus
 Wærn
 Huss
 von Hall
 Thulstrup
 af Kleen
 Ros
 de Maré
 Oldevig
 Bohnstedt
 Reventlow
 von Möller
 von Malmborg
 
 Bennich
 Dickson
 Palander af Vega
 Wijk
 Pantzerhielm
 Hedin
 Berencreutz
 Gentzschein
 von Braun
 von Rosen af Kardina
 von Samson-Himmelstjerna
 Sandelhjelm

Unintroduced nobility

Princely families
Bernadotte (Belgian princely title awarded to Prince Carl Bernadotte)
Cantacuzino (boyar family, Russian princely title)

Ducal families
D'Otrante (Napoleonic nobility)

Marquis families
Joussineau de Tourdonnet (French nobility)
Lagergren (Papal/Italian nobility)

Comital families

Bernadotte of Wisborg (Luxembourgish title awarded to various members of the House of Bernadotte)
Crapon de Caprona
Fouché d'Otrante (Napoleonic nobility)
von der Groeben (German nobility)
von Hallwyl (Swiss nobility)
Joussineau de Tourdonnet (French nobility)
Lagergren (Papal/Italian nobility)
Landberg
Moltke (German/Danish nobility)
Moltke-Hvitfeldt (German/Danish nobility)
de Paus (Papal/Italian nobility)
von Platen zu Hallermund (German nobility)
Révay (Hungarian nobility)
Reventlow (Danish/German nobility)
House of Stolberg (German nobility)
Tolstoy (Russian nobility)
von Trampe (German nobility)

Baronial families

von Bonsdorff (Finnish nobility)
von Bredow (German nobility)
von Buddenbrock
von Buxhoeveden
Cronstedt
von Grothusen
von Gussich
von Leithner
von Mecklenburg
von der Osten-Sacken
von der Pahlen (Russian nobility)
von Rosen (Hoch-Rosen)
Rosenørn-Lehn (Danish nobility)
von Strauss
von Wangenheim
de Wendel (Portuguese nobility)

Untitled noble families

 von Ahlefeldt
 von Ajkay
 von Arnold
 von Baumgarten
 Békássy de Békás
 von Below
 Berencreutz
 von Bonsdorff
 von Bornstedt
 von Braun
 Bratt från Brattfors
 de Bronikowsky
 Bukowski Bòncz
 Castenschiold
 Cederwald
 de Champs
 von Corswant
 von Delwig
 von Eckermann
 Ekestubbe
 von Elern
 Erdeös
 von der Esch
 von Euler-Chelpin
 Falkenskiold
 Fegræus
 von Feilitzen
 Flindt
 von Friedrichs
 von Gaffron und Oberstradam
 Gahn (of Colquhoun)
 von Gerber
 von Glehn
 Granath
 Green af Rossö
 von Greyerz
 Grill
 von der Groeben
 Grubbe
 von Hackman
 Hackman
 von Hackwitz
 Hajdukiewicz
 Halkiewicz
 von Harbou
 von Haugwitz
 von Heideken
 Heymowski
 Holck
 von Homeyer
 von Horn af Rantzien
 von Horn
 von Johnstone
 Kennedy
 Kepinski
 von Kieseritsky
 Kinding
 von Knorring
 von Kothen
 von Koenigsegg
 von Krassow
 Lahováry
 von der Lancken
 von Landwüst
 
 Linder
 von Löwenadler
 Lövenstierne
 von der Lühe
 von Malortie
 von Mecklenburg
 Michaelsen
 Mikulowski
 von der Mosel
 Munthe
 Murray
 Munsterhjelm
 von Mühlenfels
 von Nandelstadh
 de Neergaard
 von Normann
 Norrmén
 von Oppeln-Bronikowski
 Osváth (de Thorna)
 Ouchterlony
 Pantzarhielm
 Patek
 von Perner
 von Platen
 von Preen
 Priklonsky
 Przybyszewski
 Quarles von Ufford
 von Redlich
 von Reedtz
 von Rehbinder
 von Rennenkampff
 von Rettig
 Reutern
 Ridderståhle
 Robertson-Pearce
 de Ron
 von Rosen (Stralsund)
 Rosenörn-Lehn
 von Roth
 von Rothstein
 Rouget de St Hermine
 de Rzewuski
 Le Sage de Fontenay
 von Samson-Himmelstjerna
 von Schmaltz
 von Schmidten
 von Schoultz (Livland)
 von Schubert
 von Schultz
 von Schreeb
 Schürer von Waldheim
 von Schönberg
 Schönhoff  (von Schöneman)
 Seaton
 von Segebaden
 Segerstråle
 von Stahl
 de 'Sigray
 Soltan
 Stjernblad
 von Syberg
 von Sydow
 Treschow
 von Urbanski
 von Uthmann
 von Vegesack
 Walleen
 Walterstorff
 von Weyhe
 von Weymarn
 Wleügel
 von Zweigbergk

See also 
 Swedish name

Notes

References

External links
 Svensk Aristokrati\Swedish aristocracy

Swedish noble
Swedish